Xiyunykus (meaning "western claw"; "xiyu" is Mandarin for "west" and refers to Western China where it was found) is an alvarezsaur from the Early Cretaceous of the Tugulu Group of China. It includes one species, Xiyunykus pengi.

Paleoecology
Dinosaurs contemporaneous with Xiyunykus in the Tugulu Group of Xinjiang include the stegosaur Wuerhosaurus, the coeval alvarezsaur Tugulusaurus, the carcharodontosaurid Kelmayisaurus, the dubious maniraptoran Phaedrolosaurus, the problematic coelurosaur Xinjiangovenator, and the ceratopsian Psittacosaurus xinjiangensis.

Evolutionary significance
Xiyunykus, along with Bannykus, fills a 70-million year gap in alvarezsaur evolution by exhibiting cranial and postcranial morphologies intermediate between the typical theropod forelimb of Haplocheirus and the highly reduced forelimbs and minute teeth of Late Cretaceous alvarezsaurids.

References

Alvarezsaurs
Fossil taxa described in 2018
Early Cretaceous dinosaurs of Asia